is a Japanese male singer-songwriter. He was born on April 5, 1946 in Okuchi, Kagoshima and raised in Hiroshima. He made his debut with the single "Imeji no Uta / Mark II" on June 1, 1970. His 1972 recording of "Tabi no Yado" sold over one million copies by September that year, and was awarded a gold disc. He established the record company "For Life Records" with Yosui Inoue, Shigeru Izumiya, and Hitoshi Komuro in 1975.

Discography

Albums 
 Yoshida Takuro Seishun no Uta – Re-released on February 21, 1990
 Yoshida Takuro on Stage Tomodachi <live album>  – Re-released on February 21, 1990
 Yoshida Takuro Ningen nante – Re-released on February 21, 1990
 Genki desu. – Re-released on February 21, 1990
 Otogi Zoushi  – Re-released on February 21, 1990
 Ima ha Mada Jinsei wo Katarazu – Re-released on February 21, 1990
 Asu ni Mukatte Hashire (May 25, 1976) – Re-released on February 21, 1990
 Private (April 25, 1977) – Re-released on February 21, 1990
 Oinaru Hito (November 25, 1977) – Re-released on February 21, 1990
 Roling 30 (November 21, 1978)- Re-released on April 21, 1988
 Shangli-la (May 5, 1980) – Re-released on February 21, 1990
 Asia no Katasumi de (November 5, 1980) – Re-released on February 21, 1990
 Only You (May 1, 1981) – Re-released on February 21, 1990
 Mujinto de ... (December 5, 1981)
 Osamatachi no Haikingu in Budokan <live album> (November 21, 1982) – Re-released on March 21, 1990
 Marathon (May 21, 1983) – Re-released on February 21, 1990
 Jonetsu (November 5, 1983) – Re-released on February 21, 1990
 Forever Young (October 21, 1984)
 Ore ga Aishita Baka (June 5, 1985)
 Yoshida Takuro One Last Night in Tsumagoi <live album> (1985)
 The Yoshida Takuro <best album> (June 21, 1986) – Re-released on September 21, 1989
 Samarkand Blue (September 5, 1986)
 Much Better (April 21, 1988)
 Himawari (February 8, 1989)
 176.5 (January 10, 1990)
 détente (June 12, 1991)
 Yoshida-cho no Uta (July 29, 1992)
 Travellin' Man Live at NHK Studio 101 <live album> (December 17, 1993)
 Long time no see (June 21, 1995)
 Life (April 19, 1996)
 Kando Ryoko Nami Takashi (August 21, 1996)
 Minna Daisuki (November 1, 1997)
 Hawaiian Rhapsody (October 30, 1998)
 Yoshida Takuro The Best Penny Lane (November 3, 1999)
 Yoshida Takuro in the Box (November 22, 2000) – A 25 CDs complete collection of works.  Re-released on December 18, 2002
 Konnichiwa (2001)
 Yoshida no Uta (August 22, 2001)
 Oldies (2002)
 Golden Best Yoshida Takuro The Live Best (November 27, 2002)
 Tsukiyo no Canoe (2003)
 Yutakanaru Ichinichi  <live album> (2004)
 Isshun no Natsu (2005)
 Hodokyo no Ue de (2007)
 Gozenchu ni (April 2009)
 18ji Kaien <live album> (2009)
 Gogo no Tenki (2012)
 Yoshida Takuro Live Concert in Tsumagoi (September 2012)

References

External links 
 Yoshida Takuro at For Life Music Entertainment
 Yoshida Takuro at Imperial Records (a Teichiku label)
 Yoshida Takuro at Avex Group

1946 births
Living people
Musicians from Hiroshima
Japanese male singer-songwriters
Japanese folk singers
Musicians from Kagoshima Prefecture
20th-century Japanese male singers
20th-century Japanese singers
21st-century Japanese male singers
21st-century Japanese singers